Blind Terror is a 2001 thriller film directed by Giles Walker and starring Nastassja Kinski, Stewart Bick and Gordon Pinsent. It was written by Douglas Soesbe.

Premise
Kinski plays a wealthy, talented young widow who remarries in haste.  Suddenly her world is shattered by a series of threatening calls from her new husband's ex-wife.  When efforts to stop the woman's assault of terror fails, Kinski is forced to act on her own, uncovering a secret.

Cast

External links

2000s mystery thriller films
2001 films
Canadian mystery thriller films
English-language Canadian films
Films directed by Giles Walker
2000s English-language films
2000s Canadian films